is a Japanese musical composer originally from Hyōgo, Japan working for the visual novel brand Key under VisualArt's. Before forming Key, Orito worked for another software company named Leaf where he contributed to four games. After leaving Leaf, Orito transferred to another company named Tactics where he had a hand in the creation of three games for that company: Dōsei, Moon, and One: Kagayaku Kisetsu e. After forming Key, Orito has put much work into such famous titles as Kanon, Air and Clannad. Orito has been influenced by the famous Japanese composers Joe Hisaishi and Yuzo Koshiro.

Career
After graduating from high school, Orito went to work at a bank, but due to a recession in the economy, the bank eventually fell to restructuring, and Orito quit soon after. Orito originally found new work at the video game developer TGL composing music, but was invited by a friend from high school named Naoya Shimokawa (now the president of Aquaplus) to come work for the video game developer Leaf, which Orito accepted. Starting in 1995, Orito composed music for three of Leaf's game: DR2 Night Janki, Filsnown: Hikari to Koku, and Shizuku (precursor of To Heart). While Leaf's next game Hatsune no Naisho!! was under production, Orito quit Leaf. Orito got a part-time job working for a post office while providing outsourced musical composition for the video game developer Tactics under Nexton for the game Dōsei; afterwards, Orito was hired into Tactics where he helped compose music for two more games: Moon, and One: Kagayaku Kisetsu e.

In 1999, Orito and much of the staff who made both Moon and One, including Jun Maeda, Itaru Hinoue, Naoki Hisaya, and OdiakeS, left Tactics to work under the video game publishing company VisualArt's where they formed the company Key. At Key, Orito has composed music for all of Key's titles, though he only contributed to a single track on the original soundtrack for Planetarian: The Reverie of a Little Planet. Music that Orito composes for Key titles is published on Key's record label Key Sounds Label. The first album on the label, Humanity..., was produced by Orito for his temporary band Work-S. Orito was also the director for the remix album OTSU Club Music Compilation Vol.1, also on Key Sounds Label, and is a member of OTSU, standing for the Organized Trance Sequential Unit. During his time at Key, Orito has provided outsourced musical composition for three games by three separate companies also under VisualArt's. The first was for the game Sense Off by Otherwise, followed by the game Shoya Kinjō by Giant Panda, and finally the game Realize by Playm. In 2001, Orito composed the opening and ending themes for the anime series Please Teacher!. In 2006, Orito composed the song "Precious" on Mami Kawada's debut album Seed. Between December 2007 and August 2010, Orito was one of three personalities (the others being Itaru Hinoue and another woman named Chiro working for Pekoe, another visual novel studio under VisualArt's) on an Internet radio show sponsored by Key in regards to the brand called Key Net Radio. Orito composed the music for Key's game Rewrite (2011) and its fan disc Rewrite Harvest festa! (2012). Orito released his album Circle of Fifth in October 2012. In 2016, Orito composed music for Key's game Harmonia.

Shinji Orito's musical roots come from him producing dōjin music as a hobby. He used to visit a music BBS named Unison-BBS; Orito named his dōjin circle Unison Label after the website, which has since disappeared from the Internet. Many people were involved with the circle, which focused on a musical style similar to that of featured in bishōjo games. This group was in operation between 1994 and 2000, well into Orito's professional career.

References

External links
Key's official website 
Key Sounds Label official website 
OTSU official website 

1973 births
Anime composers
Japanese composers
Japanese film score composers
Japanese male composers
Japanese male film score composers
Japanese techno musicians
Key (company)
Living people
Musicians from Hyōgo Prefecture
Video game composers